Damaged Goods is a British independent record label.

History
Damaged Goods records formed in 1988 from a living room in east London. The first release was a re-issue of the 1977 single by Slaughter and the Dogs, "Where Have All the Bootboys Gone?". Following positive reviews in the UK music press it was followed  by a reissue of the same band's debut album Do It Dog Style. Releases by Adam and the Ants, The Killjoys, Pork Dukes, and Snivelling Shits followed.
Damaged Goods was originally intended to be a punk re-issue label but by 1990 was releasing contemporary bands, including a single by The Sect, and an EP by Manic Street Preachers.

In early 1991, they released their first single by Billy Childish (with Thee Headcoats), followed by many more, including the debut Thee Headcoatees single. They now manage the Billy Childish back catalogue.
Between 1992 and 1994, Damaged Goods released the debut single from Helen Love along with one-off singles with Atari Teenage Riot, New Bomb Turks, Wat Tyler and Asian Dub Foundation. By 1995, DG was a full-time occupation concentrating on the UK garage punk scene based around Toe Rag Studios in London and Slim Chance's Wild Western Rooms in Archway, as well as indie and punk releases.

In 1995, they released the debut Holly Golightly album The Good Things. They have since released fifteen albums by Holly.

Over the next decade Damaged Goods released records by J Church, TV Personalities, The Revillos, Mikabomb, The Priscillas, The Buff Medways, and Buzzcocks

2008 saw the release of new albums from Billy Childish and his new band The Musicians of the British Empire and a second album from Holly Golightly & The Brokeoffs. Re-issues included Psykik Volts, Thee Headcoatees, Johnny Moped,  Thee Milkshakes and Rudi and further releases included Betty and the Werewolves, the debut album from The Wolfmen and new albums from Ludella Black and Graham Day & the Gaolers.

In 2010 Damaged Goods was named 'DIY Label of the Week' by BBC Radio 1 journalist Huw Stephens.

During the 2010s Damaged Goods released new albums by Johnny Moped, Cyanide Pills, Cowbell, Giuda, Fabienne Delsol, The Senior Service, The Cute Lepers, Pete Molinari, Piney Gir & many more.

2018 was Damaged Goods 30th anniversary and is celebrating with a retrospective compilation and a 7" singles club as well as five gigs in London.

Latest signings include Amyl And The Sniffers, Galileo 7, Thee Dagger Debs & The Shadracks

Artists
 Action Painting
 Adam and the Ants
 Agebaby
 Age of Jets
 Amyl And The Sniffers
 Anorak Girl
 Armitage Shanks
 Asian Dub Foundation
 Baby Birkin
 Bambi
 Betty and the Werewolves
 Bette Davis and the Balconettes
 Big Boy Tomato
 Billy Childish
 Blaggers ITA
 Blubber
 The Bolsheviks
 The Bristols
 The Budget Girls
 Butcher Boy
 Buzzcocks
 Case
 Cee Bee Beaumont
 The Chefs
 Clayson and the Argonauts
 Cowbell
 Cuban Boys
 Cyanide Pills
 Deep Wound
 The Del Monas
 The Dils
 The Dirty Burds
 Dustball
 Dutronc
 Dweeb
 Terry Edwards
 Fabienne Delsol
 Fire Dept.
 Formica
 The Gaggers
 The Galileo 7
 Genius Freak
 Giuda
 Goldblade Featuring Poly Styrene
 Graham Day and the Gaolers
 Guaranteed Ugly
 Guy Hamper Trio
 Hard Skin
 Helen Love
 Holly Golightly
 Honeyrider
 Hopper
 Huegunius
 Identity
 J Church
 Jimi Ben Band
 Johnny Moped
 The Killjoys
 Kyra Rubella
 Lockjaw
 Lovesick
 Ludicrous Lollipops
 The Lurkers
 Manic Street Preachers
 Ludella Black
 The Melons
 Thee Mighty Caesars
 Mikabomb
 The Milkshakes
 Monkhouse
 Nat Johnson and the Figureheads
 New Bomb Turks
 Oizone
 One Car Pile-Up
 Pansy Division
 Pebbles
PeeChees
 Penetration
 Period Pains
 Pete Molinari
 Phantom Pregnancies
 Piney Gir
 Piney Gir Country Roadshow
 Pop Rivets
 Pork Dukes
 Pop Am Good
 Psykik Volts
 The pUKEs
 Reverse
 The Revillos
 Roadholders
 Roxy Epoxy & The Rebound
 Rugrat
 The Sect
 The Senior Service
 Serious Drinking European Cup Squad
 Severed Limb
 Sexton Ming
 Shelley's Children
 The Shadracks
 The Shall I Say Quois
 Shout
 Singing Loins
 Slaughter And The Dogs
 Slime
 Snap Her
 The SolarFlares
 Some Chicken
 Thee Spivs
 Spizzenergi
 Thee Stash
 Stratford Sparrows
 Stuckists
 Supercute
 Tallulah Gosh
 Television Personalities
 Thee Dagger Debs
 Thee Headcoats
 Thee Headcoatees
 Thrilled Skinny
 Toast
 The Unwanted
 The Users
 Wat Tyler
 Wild Billy Childish and the Blackhands
 Wild Billy Childish and the Buff Medways
 Wild Billy Childish and the Chatham Singers
 Wild Billy Childish and CTMF
 Wild Billy Childish and the Musicians of the British Empire
 Wild Billy Childish and the Spartan Dreggs
 Witch
 The Wolfmen

See also
 List of record labels
 List of independent UK record labels

References

External links
 Official website
 BBC Interview 2010

British independent record labels
Alternative rock record labels
Indie rock record labels
Punk record labels
Garage rock record labels